Teredidae is a family of beetles in the superfamily Coccinelloidea, formerly included within the family Bothrideridae. There are around 160 species in 10 genera, found worldwide except South America. Teredids are generally found under bark, in the galleries of wood-boring beetles, or in leaf litter. They are thought to be fungivores. The oldest records of the family are Delteredolaemus hei from the Cretaceous amber from Myanmar and a species of Teredolaemus from Eocene aged Baltic amber.

Genera

 Subfamily Teredinae
 Tribe Sysolini 
 Sysolus Grouvelle, 1908
 Tribe Sosylopsini
 Sosylopsis Grouvelle, 1910
 Tribe Teredini
 Teredus Dejean, 1835
 Oxylaemus Erichson, 1845
 Teredomorphus Heinze, 1943
 Rustleria Stephan, 1989
 Teredolaemus Sharp, 1885
 Subfamily Anommatinae
 Anommatus Wesmael, 1835
 Subfamily Xylariophilinae
 Xylariophilus Pal & Lawrence, 1986

 Abromus Reitter, 1876
 Kocherius Coiffait, 1984

References

Further reading

 
 
 
 
 
 
 
 
 
 
 

Coccinelloidea
Polyphaga families